Hannah Margaret McNair "Maggie" Mac Neil (born 26 February 2000) is a Canadian competitive swimmer. A 100 metre butterfly event specialist, she is the 2020 Olympic champion, 2019 World (LC) champion, two-time World (SC) champion (2021–2022), and 2022 Commonwealth champion in that event, and also holds the current Americas record (55.59s) and the world record in the short course 100 metre butterfly.

One of Canada's most accomplished swimmers, she is a three-time Olympic medalist, six-time World (LC) medalist, eleven-time World (SC) medalist, and five-time Commonwealth medalist. She also holds the world record in the short course 50 metre backstroke.

Early life
Mac Neil was born in Jiujiang, China, in February 2000 and was adopted by her Canadian family a year later. Growing up in London, Ontario, Mac Neil's first competitive experience as a swimmer came with the team of the school she first took lessons from. She would later cite the 2008 Summer Olympics in Beijing as the point where she "started to take swimming seriously and knew that I wanted to pursue it further." She competed for Sir Frederick Banting Secondary School and the London Aquatic Club prior to her acceptance at the University of Michigan.

College career 
Competing for the University of Michigan, Mac Neil first tied the NCAA record for the 100 yard butterfly, and then broke it at the 2021 NCAA Swimming and Diving Championships in March 2021. She was the first in the NCAA to post a time under 49 seconds (48.89), and the first Michigan swimmer to win an NCAA title since 2008. She went on to win a second gold medal at the same championship, taking the 100 yard freestyle title.

Mac Neil concluded her time at the University of Michigan with two bronze medals at the 2022 NCAA Division I Women's Swimming and Diving Championships. A slip and fall on the pool deck while attending the championships resulted in a "slight" elbow fracture that required rehabilitation.

On March 25, she announced that she would be transferring to finish her final year of NCAA eligibility at the University of California, Berkeley, where she would be beginning graduate studies in sports management. However, in June she announced that she had changed her plans, and would instead be transferring to Louisiana State University to compete with the LSU Lady Tigers. The move reunited her with former Michigan coach Rick Bishop, and was speculated by Swimming World to have been connected to a burgeoning scandal surrounding Berkeley swim coach Teri McKeever.

In her final appearance at the SEC championships, helping the Lady Tigers win a record fifth gold medal. Winning three individual gold medals, she was named the female swimmer of the meet.

Professional career

2015–2018
After various age group successes domestically, MacNeil appeared in her first international competition in 2015, winning two butterfly finals at the Arena Pro Swim Series in Orlando. Performing well at the 2015 Canadian trials, she was selected to make her major international debut at the 2015 FINA World Junior Swimming Championships in Singapore. In preparation for that event, she was part of a Canadian team sent to the Australian age group national competition in Sydney. She called it a "great experience" to compete at the Sydney Olympic Park Aquatic Centre, the site of swimming competitions at the 2000 Summer Olympics. Her best result in Singapore was twentieth in the heats of the 100 m butterfly. The following year, Mac Neil placed sixth in the 100 m butterfly event trials for Canada's 2016 Olympic team. Based on her trial results, she was assigned to compete at the 2016 Junior Pan Pacific Swimming Championships in Maui, where her best individual placement was fifth in the 100 m butterfly.

In 2017, Mac Neil missed qualification for the 2017 FINA World Junior Swimming Championships, a significant disappointment for her. She improved the following year, doing sufficiently well at the 2018 Canadian national trials to qualify for the 2018 Pan Pacific Swimming Championships, earning the FINA "A" standard in both the 100 m freestyle and 100 m butterfly, finishing the runner up in the latter event behind reigning Olympic silver medalist Penny Oleksiak. However, she opted to decline the assignment in order to focus on the 2018 Junior Pan Pacific Swimming Championships, explaining that while she was "over the moon to have qualified," she wanted to focus on her more competitive event. Competing in Fiji, Mac Neil won her first major international medals, most notably her first championship title in the 100 m butterly, where she set an event record of 58.38. She also won three relay medals as part of the Canadian women's teams.

2019–2021
Mac Neil was part of the Canadian women's team at the 2019 World Aquatics Championships in Gwangju. She first won a bronze medal as part of the 4×100 m freestyle relay team, alongside Penny Oleksiak, Taylor Ruck, Kayla Sanchez, and Rebecca Smith. Mac Neil then competed in and won gold in the women's 100 metre butterfly, beating four-time World and reigning Olympic champion Sarah Sjöström, in what was considered a major upset. She closed out the championships as part of the Canadian 4×100 m medley team, swimming the final with Kylie Masse, Sydney Pickrem and Oleksiak. The team finished third, winning Mac Neil's second bronze medal of the event, and setting a record of eight medals for Canada at a single world championship. Her plans for the 2020 international season were significantly disrupted by the onset of the COVID-19 pandemic, which ultimately delayed the Summer Olympics by a full year.

In June 2021, Mac Neil qualified to represent Canada at the 2020 Summer Olympics in Tokyo. Mac Neil first competed as part of the Canadian team for the 4×100 m freestyle relay, replacing Ruck for the event final and swimming a 53.47 second split to help take the silver medal, Mac Neil's first Olympic medal. The following day, Mac Neil competed in the final of the 100 m butterfly event, taking the gold medal by a margin of 0.05 seconds over China's Zhang Yufei, setting a new personal best and Americas record of 55.59. She was the first Canadian gold medalist of the 2020 Tokyo Games. Mac Neil wears glasses, and without contacts or prescription goggles, could not immediately see her results; it took her a few seconds to focus on the results board and realize she won gold. Cameras focused on her squinting at the results board, and she said after that "I was just trying to squint and see where I came. I heard my name getting called, so I knew I must have done something good." Mac Neil's final event was the 4×100 m medley relay, where she posted a 55.27 time in her leg of the relay and the Canadian team won the bronze medal, Mac Neil's third of the Olympics. The Association of National Olympic Committees subsequently named her the "Best Female Athlete of Tokyo 2020".

At the end of the year, Mac Neil was part of the Canadian delegation to the 2021 FINA World Swimming Championships (25 m) in Abu Dhabi, the top international event competed in a short course pool. She won the gold medal in the 50 m backstroke, setting a new world record in the process, afterward admitting that she would never have expected to set her first world record in that stroke. She won gold as well in the 100 m butterfly with a national record time of 55.04, making her the first woman to hold Olympic, World Aquatic, World Swimming, and NCAA titles in the same event simultaneously, and the second person to do so after Aaron Peirsol. She won three other medals, two gold and a silver, in relay events at the championships. She was one of seven finalists for the 2021 Lou Marsh Trophy, awarded annually to Canada's top athlete.

2022–present
In the months following the Olympics, Mac Neil had begun to struggle with the weight of expectations on her, and following discussions with Swimming Canada's high performance staff, opted not to attempt a defense of her World title at the 2022 World Aquatics Championships. She instead planned to participate in relay events there, and then return to competing the butterfly at the 2022 Commonwealth Games later in the year. Reflecting on the decision, she said "it's hard to stay at the top and that pressure really got to me. I need a chill summer."

Beginning the World Aquatics Championships in the 4x100 m freestyle relay, Mac Neil was part of Canada's silver medal-winning team, a first for Canadian women at the World Championships. Mac Neil swam the anchor leg for the Canadian team in the heats of the 4×100 m mixed freestyle relay, helping them qualify to the event final in second place. She was replaced by Penny Oleksiak in the final, but shared in the team's silver medal win. In her final event of the championships, Mac Neil swam the butterfly leg in both the heats and the final of the 4×100 m medley relay, winning another bronze medal with the Canadian team.

Named to her first Commonwealth Games team, Mac Neil began the first day of the championships by winning the bronze medal in the mixed 4×100 m freestyle relay, and qualifying to the event final of the 100 m butterfly with the second-fastest time in both the heats and semi-finals. On the second day of the Games, Mac Neil set a Games record to win gold in the 100 m butterfly, ousting defending champion Emma McKeon by 0.02 seconds, and shortly afterward won a second bronze medal in the 4×100 m freestyle relay. In the relay she was credited with a "dominant anchor leg" that nearly took the Canadian team into second place. Mac Neil called her decision to step back from competing individual events "the best decision I made for myself at the time, both physically and emotionally." She finished fourth in the 50 m butterfly, but then won two silver medals swimming the butterfly legs of the 4×100 m mixed medley and 4×100 m medley relays, finishing the Birmingham Games with five medals.

Mac Neil concluded the year at the 2022 FINA World Swimming Championships in Melbourne. In her first individual event, she won gold in the 50 m butterfly, tying American rival Torri Huske with a time of 24.64, a national record. She won a second gold medal in the 50 m backstroke, improving her own previous world record time to 25.25. Her third and final gold medal of the event came in the 100 m butterfly, where she won in a world record time of 54.05, out-touching Huske by 0.70 seconds. Mac Neil also won three bronze medals in the relay events, and was named the female swimmer of the championship. Speaking afterward, she reflected that after "a rocky first half of the year" she was "enjoying swimming more than ever."

Honours and awards 
 2023 YMCA of Southwestern Ontario Young Woman of Excellence
 Best Female Athlete of the Championships, 2022 SCW Melbourne
 2021 ANOC Award, "Best Female Athlete of Tokyo 2020".

Personal bests

Long course (50-meter pool)

Short course (25-meter pool)

World records

Short Course (25m)

Notes

References

External links
 

2000 births
Living people
Canadian female butterfly swimmers
Canadian female freestyle swimmers
Canadian sportspeople of Chinese descent
Chinese adoptees
Medalists at the 2020 Summer Olympics
Michigan Wolverines women's swimmers
Olympic gold medalists for Canada
Olympic silver medalists for Canada
Olympic gold medalists in swimming
Olympic silver medalists in swimming
People from Jiujiang
Swimmers at the 2020 Summer Olympics
Swimmers from Jiangxi
Swimmers from London, Ontario
World Aquatics Championships medalists in swimming
Medalists at the FINA World Swimming Championships (25 m)
Swimmers at the 2022 Commonwealth Games
Commonwealth Games medallists in swimming
Commonwealth Games gold medallists for Canada
Commonwealth Games silver medallists for Canada
Commonwealth Games bronze medallists for Canada
21st-century Canadian women
Medallists at the 2022 Commonwealth Games